Royal Prussian Jagdstaffel 71, commonly abbreviated to Jasta 71, was a "hunting group" (i.e., fighter squadron) of the Luftstreitkräfte, the air arm of the Imperial German Army during World War I. The squadron would score eight aerial victories during the war, including three observation balloons downed. The unit's victories came at the expense of four killed in action and one wounded in action.

History
Jasta 71 was founded on 6 February 1918, at Fliegerersatz-Abteilung ("Replacement Detachment") 13, Bromberg. The new squadron went operational on 17 February. Four days later, it was assigned to Armee-Abteilung B. Jasta 71 scored its first aerial victory on 9 May 1918. The squadron served through war's end.

Commanding officers (Staffelführer)
 Hermann Stutz

Duty stations
 Colmar South: 21 February 1918
 Habsheim, France: 27 March 1918
 Sierenz: 3 June 1918
 Habsheim 24 June 1918

References

Bibliography
 

71
Military units and formations established in 1918
1918 establishments in Germany
Military units and formations disestablished in 1918
History of Bydgoszcz